Gabriel Laiseca (born 28 June 1936) is a Spanish sailor. He competed in the Flying Dutchman event at the 1960 Summer Olympics.

References

External links
 

1936 births
Living people
Spanish male sailors (sport)
Olympic sailors of Spain
Sailors at the 1960 Summer Olympics – Flying Dutchman
Snipe class world champions
Sailors (sport) from the Basque Country (autonomous community)
Sportspeople from Getxo
Sportspeople from Biscay